Caxambu is a Brazilian municipality in Minas Gerais. Its population in 2021 was estimated at 21,566.

Caxambu is renowned for its spa which has twelve sources of mineral sparkling water flowing 24 hours a day
and a cold-water geyser.

References

External links

Municipalities in Minas Gerais